Djilas (also spelled Djilass or Djilasse) is a village in Senegal located in the Sine-Saloum, in the west.

Administration
It is the chef-lieu  of the rural community of Djilas, located in the Fimela Arrondissement, of the Fatick Department and the Region of Fatick.

History
Djilas is situated in the ancient Kingdom of Sine, one of the precolonial kingdoms of the Serer people.  In precolonial times, the Thilas - a Serer title of nobility took residence at Djilas.

Population
In 2003, the local population was estimated to be 2889 with 327 houses.

Notes

External links
 Maps, weather, videos and airports for Djilas
 Plan hydraulique et d'assainissement (PLHA) de la communauté rurale de Djilasse, octobre 2007, 25 p.

Populated places in Fatick Region